Pendleton Shipyard Company was a shipyard in New Orleans, Louisiana started by Pendleton E. Leyde in 1941. Pendleton Shipyard Company build ships for World War II under the Emergency Shipbuilding Program. Pendleton Shipyard Company sold the yard to John Wise Calmes, who opened the Calmes Engineering at the site. In addition to shipbuilding the yard handling inspection and delivery of small ships built in inland shipyards up the Mississippi River to turn over to the United States Navy. The Calmes Engineering shipyard closed in April 1958 shortly after the death of Calmes.

Pendleton Shipyard Company ships
Pendleton Shipyard Company built ships.

V4-M-A1
V4-M-A1 is a Type V ship tugboat. The V4-M-A1 was the largest and most powerful tugs in the world when they were built. Each was named after lighthouses, built with steel hulls, at 1,613 tons, 195 foot long, beam 37.5 foot, draft 15.5 foot. Max. speed 14 knots. There were two engine manufacturers: National Supply Company, with 8-cylinder sets of 3,200 bhp and the Enterprise Engine & Trading Company with 6 cylinders and 2,340 bhp power.

N3-S-A2

N3-S-A2 is Type N3 ship, a small coastal cargo ship. N3-S-A2 are 258 ft 9 in (78.87 m) long, a beam	of 42 ft 1 in (12.83 m), tonnage of 	2,905 dwt, displacement	of 14,245 long tons (14,474 t) and draft of 20 ft 9 in (6.32 m). The ship has 1300 shaft horsepower with a top seed of 10.2 knots (11.7 mph; 18.9 km/h).

Calmes Engineering
Calmes Engineering built ships:

See also
Delta Shipbuilding
Avondale Shipyard

References

1941 establishments in Louisiana
Defunct shipbuilding companies of the United States